The following lists events that will happen in 2016 in Yemen.

Events

January
13 January - Unidentified assailants arrived on motorcycles to Sheikh Othman roundabout in Aden and shot and killed two traffic policemen. Islamist extremists are suspected.

14 January - Unidentified militants planted an explosive device on a police car in Aden, killing two and wounding another. Islamists such as Islamic State or Al-Qaeda are suspected.

17 January - A suicide bomber detonated his explosives while within a car, on the entrance of the residence of Aden police chief, General Shalal Shaea. Shaea survived the attack while eight civilians and two guards were killed. No group claimed responsibility, but Al-Qaeda in the Arabian Peninsula is suspected.

28 January - At least seven people are killed in a suicide bomb attack near the presidential palace in Aden, Yemen. The Islamic State claims it was behind the attack.

29 January - A suicide car bomber struck a checkpoint in the southern Yemen city of Aden, killing seven and wounding another eight. Islamic State affiliate in Yemen claimed responsibility for the attack.

August

9 August - At least 14 people are killed after Saudi-led coalition airstrikes hit a food factory in Yemen's capital Sana'a. The airstrikes come just days after the suspension of inconclusive peace talks in Kuwait.

13 August - At least 10 children are killed and 28 injured in an air attack on a school in northern Yemen. The Houthi group claims that the Saudi Arabia led coalition is responsible.

14 August - About 40 suspected Al-Qaeda in the Arabian Peninsula fighters are killed as Yemeni forces, aided  by Saudi-led airstrikes,  fight  their way into Zinjibar and Jaʿār in eastern Yemen.

15 August - An air strike by the Saudi-led coalition which hit a hospital in northern Yemen run by Médecins Sans Frontières (Doctors Without Borders) kills at least 11 people.

16 August - Nine Yemenis from one family die from an airstrike by the Saudi-led alliance.

References

 
Years of the 21st century in Yemen
2010s in Yemen
Yemen
Yemen